Karumuri Venkata Nageswara Rao (born 2 October 1964) is the minister for Civil Supplies and consumer affairs in Andhra Pradesh government. He is Member of the Legislative Assembly of the Indian state of Andhra Pradesh, representing Tanuku. He is a member of the YSR Congress party. He started his political career in Congress Party, he was General Secretary of Andhra Pradesh Congress Committee from 2009 to 2014.  He also served as chairperson for West Godavari Zilla Parishad for three years before being elected as MLA for the first time in 2009. He was awarded honorary doctorate in social service by Westbrook University, US in 2007. He has been appointed General Secretary of Andhra Pradesh Congress Committee on 9 June 2013. He was elected for second term as MLA from Tanuku in 2019 elections representing YSR Congress.He is the current cabinet Minister for Civil Supplies and Consumer Affairs in Andhra Pradesh

Early life and family
Karumuri Nageswara Rao was born to Karumuri Ramakrishna and Karumuri Suryakathamma 2 October 1964, in Attili, West Godavari district. He moved to Hyderabad at the age of 18 and started his own business. He has two sisters and a brother who is a chemistry professor in Tanuku. In 1989 he was married to Lakshmi Kiran. The couple have a son and daughter.

References

1964 births
Living people
Indian National Congress politicians from Andhra Pradesh
Andhra Pradesh MLAs 2009–2014
Andhra Pradesh MLAs 2019–2024
Andhra Pradesh district councillors
People from West Godavari district